Shripal Morakhia (Marathi: श्रीपाल मोराखिया) is an Indian businessman, film director and film producer. Morakhia is best known for his directorial debut Naina (2005). Presently, Morakhia is chairman of Smaaash a sports entertainment venture with his equity partner and former cricketer Sachin Tendulkar.

Early life
Morakhia was a stock broker and executive assistant to President of New York Stock Exchange. Thereafter, Morakhia also opened an investment bank outfit SSKI and online portal Sharekhan.

Venture in sports entertainment
Morakhia founded entertainment centre Smaaash in 2012 which holds the equity of 1.5 billion rupees after the investment by FW Sports Investment Fund (FSIF). The venture is co-operated by STAR India.

Venture into film industry
Morakhia also launched his film production and film distribution company named iDream Productions in early 2000 and distributed many films. Morakhia holds 50% stake of the production house.

Controversy over Naina
Morakhia's directorial venture Naina faced oppositions by public and ophthalmologists from India, stated that film will discourage eye donors to donate eyes. Morakhia defended the film claimed that Naina won't discourage any medical institution.

Filmography
Naina (2005)

References

External links

Living people
Hindi-language film directors
Film producers from Mumbai
Hindi film producers
Year of birth missing (living people)